Pure was a Belgian public radio station created in 2004, focused on music genres such as pop, rock, hip hop, contemporary R&B, and electronic. It is operated by the Radio télévision belge de la communauté française (RTBF). Pure is the French language equivalent of the Flemish Studio Brussel.

History 

On 1 April 2004, the public rock/pop radio station Radio 21 owned by the RTBF stops broadcasting to be replaced by two new radio stations, Classic 21 and Pure FM. In 2010, Pure FM changed its logo. In January 2017, the station dropped the "FM" suffix from its name.

From 7 September 2020, Pure FM merged with La Deux, RTBF's second channel, to form a new brand for young people called Tipik. Tipik is available on TV as a channel replacing La Deux, on radio replacing Pure FM, and online.

Reception

FM 

(*) The RTBF does not broadcast in this region or country, but can be heard there clearly.

AM

DAB

See also 
 RTBF
 List of radio stations in Belgium
 Classic 21
 Studio Brussel

2004 establishments in Belgium
2020 disestablishments in Belgium
French-language radio stations in Belgium
Mass media in Brussels
Radio stations established in 2004
Radio stations disestablished in 2020